Craig Philip Blair (born October 17, 1959) is an American politician and a Republican member of the West Virginia Senate representing District 15 since January 12, 2013. Blair served non-consecutively in the West Virginia Legislature from January 2003 until January 2011 in the West Virginia House of Delegates in the District 52 seat. Blair is also the father of former WV Delegate Saira Blair.

As President of the state Senate, Blair has held the title Lieutenant Governor of West Virginia since January 2021.

Elections

2023 (president) 
In the months leading up to the 2022 senate elections, senator Patricia Rucker challenged Blair for the caucus' nomination. After the elections, however, Rucker withdrew her bid, and Blair was re-elected by acclamation. He was once again nominated by Charles Trump, and nominations were closed by minority leader Mike Woelfel.

2021 (president) 
Blair was elected as President of the Senate by acclamation, being nominated by Charles Trump. Further nominations were closed minority leader Stephen Baldwin, leaving Blair uncontested. He replaced Mitch Carmichael, who lost renomination in the previous year's elections.

2020
Blair narrowly defeated challenger Kenneth Mattson, a former military police officer and small business owner, in the Republican primary, and beat Mountain Party challenger Donald Kinnie in the general election.

2016
Blair easily defeated challenger Larry Kump in the Republican primary and Democratic challenger Brad Noll in the general election.

2012
After his unsuccessful run in 2010, Blair was redistricted to District 15, and with incumbent Senator Clark Barnes redistricted to District 11, Blair was unopposed for the May 8, 2012 Republican Primary. He went on to win the November 6, 2012 General election with 28,766 votes (80.8%) against Constitution Party candidate Daniel Litten.

2010
Rather than run for re-election to the House of Delegates, Blair challenged Senate District 16 incumbent Democratic Senator John Unger. Blair was unopposed for the May 11, 2010 Republican Primary, but lost the November 2, 2010 General election to Senator Unger by 318 votes (less than 1%).

2008
Blair was unopposed for the 2008 Republican Primary, and won the November 4, 2008 General election with 4,994 votes (54.8%) against Democratic nominee Mike Roberts.

2006
Blair was unopposed for both the 2006 Republican Primary and the November 7, 2006 General election.

2004
Blair was unopposed for the 2004 Republican Primary, and won the November 2, 2004 General election with 5,193 votes (62.5%) against Democratic nominee Scott Funk.

2002
When House District 52 Democratic Delegate Vicki Douglas retired from the Legislature and left the seat open, Blair won the 2002 Republican Primary with 624 votes (55.2%) against Jerry Mays and won the November 5, 2002 General election with 2,735 votes (64.5%) against Democratic nominee Craig Shibley.

References

External links
Official page at the West Virginia Legislature
Campaign site

Craig Blair at Ballotpedia
Craig P. Blair at the National Institute on Money in State Politics

1959 births
21st-century American politicians
Living people
Republican Party members of the West Virginia House of Delegates
Politicians from Martinsburg, West Virginia
Republican Party West Virginia state senators
Presidents of the West Virginia State Senate